Loxomphalia is a monotypic genus of  tarantulas containing the single species, Loxomphalia rubida. It was first described from a female found by Eugène Louis Simon in 1889, and it has only been found on the Zanzibar Archipelago.

See also
 List of Theraphosidae species

References

Monotypic Theraphosidae genera
Spiders of Africa
Theraphosidae